The Angier–Fuquay Springs Bulls were a 1946 minor league baseball team based in Angier, North Carolina in partnership with the Fuquay Mineral Spring area. The Angier–Fuquay Springs Bulls played as members of the Class D level Tobacco State League, winning the league championship in their only season of minor league play.

History 
Angier, North Carolina first hosted minor league play in 1946. The "Angier–Fuquay Springs Bulls" became charter members of the six–team Class D level Tobacco State League. The Clinton Blues, Dunn–Erwin Twins, Sanford Spinners, Smithfield–Selma Leafs and Wilmington Pirates teams joined Angier–Fuquay Springs as charter members in Tobacco State League play.

In their first and only season of minor league play, the 1946 Angier–Fuquay Springs Bulls won the Tobacco State League championship. The Bulls finished the 1946 Tobacco State League regular season with a 57–62 record to place 4th, finishing 14.0 games behind the 1st place Sanford Spinners. Playing under managers Paul Dunlap and Gaither Riley, the Bulls qualified for the four–team playoffs. In the 1st round of the playoffs, the Angier-Fuquay Springs Bulls defeated the Sanford Spinners 4 games to 2 to advance. In the Finals, Angier-Fuquay Springs won the Tobacco State League championship in defeating the Clinton Blues 4 games 3.

Despite winning the 1946 championship, the Angier–Fuquay Springs Bulls did not return to 1947 Tobacco State League play. The league expanded to become an eight–team league, adding the Red Springs Red Robins, Lumberton Cubs and Warsaw Reds franchises in 1947 league play.

Angier, North Carolina has not hosted another minor league team.

The ballpark
The Angier, North Carolina based Angier–Fuquay Springs Bulls minor league teams were noted to have played 1946 home games at the Angier Baseball Park. Reportedly, the ballpark had a capacity of 1,500.

Year-by-year records

Notable alumni
Dave Odom (1947)

References

External links
Baseball Reference

Defunct minor league baseball teams
Professional baseball teams in North Carolina
Defunct baseball teams in North Carolina
Baseball teams established in 1946
Baseball teams disestablished in 1950
Tobacco State League teams